Aituaje Iruobe, known professionally as Waje, which is the first letter from each word from the phrase "Words Aren't Just enough" is a Nigerian singer. She first gained recognition after being featured on the remake of P-Square’s "Omoge Mi". Waje was also featured on the duo's 2008 hit track "Do Me". She contributed vocals to Banky W's "Thief My Kele" and M.I's "One Naira". In 2016, Waje was one of the four judges in the inaugural season of The Voice Nigeria. In 2018, on its final season of Africa Magic telenovela, Battleground, Waje recurred.

Michael Chiedoziem Chukwudera on Afrocritik describes Waje as: "one of the undisputed queens of Soul music in Nigeria, and that a good argument could be made that she has had the best vocal run in the music scene over the past fifteen years."

Early life
Waje was born on September 1, in Akure, Ondo State, Nigeria. She is the firstborn and the first daughter in her family. She grew up in Benin City, following her parents' relocation. Her parents got divorced when she was young, and she had to overcome the difficulty that accompanied her parents' separation.

Waje got pregnant when she was writing her final year secondary Certificate Examinations. She did not tell her mother about the pregnancy until 5 months into the pregnancy. She was temporarily banned from singing in the choir of her church for being pregnant outside marriage.

She sang gospel tunes to the delight of the late Archbishop Benson Idahosa. who was quite impressed with her singing and helped her during her entire secondary school days. Waje later moved to Nsukka to attend the University of Nigeria, Nsukka, earning a degree in social work from the school. During her time at the University, she performed at school concerts and fellowships. She listened to singers such as Whitney Houston and Aretha Franklin to improve her craft.

Career

2007–14: Musical releases and collaborations
Waje's vocal range covers three octaves. She was found singing in church. She studied social work at the University of Nigeria, Nsukka (UNN) and worked part time in tourism. In 2007, Waje launched her music career. She was still a student at the time and paid her dues by doing many free shows and gigs.

In 2008, she featured in the P-Square hit track titled "Do Me". This track was widely known across Africa and some parts of Europe. She participated in Advanced Warning (a reality TV show which featured artists that are on the verge of a breakthrough). The reality show was organised by MTV Base South Africa and Zain Nigeria, where she was the runner-up.

In 2010, 360nobs.com did a special spotlight on Waje with the emphasis "Words Aren’t Just Enough….I’m Speechless"

Waje has shared the stage with artists such as Wyclef Jean in South Africa, opening for Kerry Hilson during a show organised in Calabar, and has also worked with artists who had hit singles, including "One Naira" with M.I and "Do Me" with P-Square. She collaborated with Dencia on "True Love"  and has songs that have received awards and nominations. She released her self-titled debut studio album Words Aren't Just Enough in 2013.

Waje made her acting debut in the 2014 film Tunnel, alongside Femi Jacobs, Patrick Doyle, Nse Ikpe-Etim and Lepacious Bose. Directed by Stanlee Ohikhuare, the film is centred around a young pastor's life.

In November 2014, she released the music video for the Diamond Platnumz-assisted "Coco Baby". In August 2015, she released the single "Left for Good", featuring Patoranking and Godwin Strings. Waje was featured on "Strong Girl", the theme song for One's Poverty is Sexist campaign, and also joined Bono for the Lagos campaign in 2015. Waje was announced as one judge on The Voice Nigeria, alongside other Nigerian musicians, including 2face Idibia, Timi Dakolo and Patoranking.

2019–21: Hermanes Media and She Is 
In January 2019, Waje and Omawumi launched Hermanes Media, a media company that specializes in film and TV production, adverts, content curation, brand event activation, and creative digital marketing.

In March 2019, Waje revealed her intentions to quit music professionally. She said she was considering quitting because of the lack of support towards her music.

In April 2019, Waje was featured in the Somkele Idhalama-produced movie She Is. She worked with Omawumi to record the movie's soundtrack.

In December 2019, she teamed up with another Nigerian rap artiste, Zoro, to release a single titled ‘Ngwa’. The song is a ballad styled song produced by Philkeyz. The lyrics of the song are in Igbo Language. This song followed her earlier released single called ‘Udue’ where she featured Johnny Drille, an artist from the Mavin records.

2022 - Present: Release of her Album Waje 2.0

In 2022, she released her album titled Waje 2.0, which is an 11-track album that has features from Tiwa Savage, Imi Lawz, Falz, Emmyblaq and Masterkraft.

Personal life

Waje is a single mother.

Her sister, Amaka Iruobe, is an actress who has had bit parts in the popular soap opera Tinsel and the movie First Cut.

Waje worked with the youths of her community through an organisation "Waje's Safe House", where she teams up with other NGOs quarterly to help fight for their cause. The first project supported under Waje's Safe House was the Mental and Environmental Development Initiative for Children, assisting the Project HELP (Help Educate the Less Privileged) which the goal of raising funds for allowing children to continue their studies in the school in Makoko, through Ring Back Tones with her singles "Oko Mi" and "I Wish".

She was one of the notable Nigerian entertainers who collaborated with the Independent National Electoral Commission (INEC) in Nigeria to stand against electoral manipulation, vote-buying, violence, and thuggery.

Discography

Studio albums
W.A.J.E (2013)
Red Velvet (2018)
Heart Season (EP) (2021)
''WAJE 2.0 (2022)

Awards and nominations

Nominations 

 Nigerian Music Video Awards 2009 (Best New Video)
 Dynamix Awards 2009 (Best New Act)
 Hip-Hop Awards 2010*Headies* (Best Vocals)
 City People Awards 2011(Best R&B Female)
 Nigerian Entertainment Awards 2011 (Best Pop/R&B Artist Of The Year. Best New Act Of The Year)
 Headies 2011 (Best Vocal Performer Female, Best R&B Single)
 Exquisite Ladies Of The Year 2011 (Female Music Act Of The Year)
 Channel O Music Video Awards 2011 (Most Gifted Female Video)
 Nigerian Music Video Awards 2011 (Best Contemporary Afro Video)
 Deafa Afro-Europe Entertainment Awards 2011 (Best African Art)
 Best Recording Of The Year 2013 (I Wish, W.A.J.E Album)
 Best Reggae/Dance Hall 2013 (I Wish, W.A.J.E Album)
 Best Vocal Performance Female 2013 (I Wish, W.A.J.E Album)
 Black Canadian Awards 2014 (Best International Act)
 World Music Awards 2014 (World Bst Album)W.A.J.E
 World Music Awards 2014 (World Best Live Act)
 World Music Awards 2014 (World Best Female Entertainer)
 World Music Awards 2014 (World Best Entertainer)
 Eloy Awards 2014 (Best Female Artist)

References 

.

See also 
 List of Nigerian musicians

Nigerian women pop singers
Nigerian women singer-songwriters
Living people
University of Nigeria alumni
21st-century Nigerian women singers
Nigerian soul singers
The Headies winners
Nigerian music industry executives
People from Akure
21st-century Nigerian actresses
Year of birth missing (living people)